The Doctor of Psychology (Psy.D. or D.Psych.) is a professional doctoral degree intended to prepare graduates for careers that apply scientific knowledge of psychology and deliver empirically based service to individuals, groups and organizations. Earning the degree was originally completed through one of two established training models for clinical psychology. However, Psy.D. programs are no longer limited to Clinical Psychology as several universities and professional schools have begun to award professional doctorates in Business Psychology, Organizational Development, Forensic Psychology, Counseling Psychology, and School Psychology.

Background

The initial guidelines for the education and training of clinical psychologists were established in 1949 at an American Psychological Association (APA)-sponsored Conference on Training in Clinical Psychology in Boulder, Colorado. Students would be prepared both to conduct experimental research and apply knowledge for clinical practice. This approach became known as the scientist–practitioner model, although it is often referred to as the Boulder model since the conference was held in Boulder, Colorado.

The difficulty integrating the education and training for both research and practice within the same degree has been long recognized. While the scientist-practitioner model ostensibly included clinical training, many argued that preparation for practice was often neglected. Some also argued that in trying to train students in both research and practice, not enough emphasis was placed on either. In regard to research, the most common number of publications by graduates of PhD. programs was zero. In regard to practice, students were not being trained effectively for the needs of people seeking services.

While the scientist-practitioner model “stood intransigent and impervious through the 1950s and 60s”, the APA attempted to respond to pressure for more and better clinical training by forming the Committee on the Scientific and Professional Aims of Psychology in 1963. The Committee concluded that the scientist-practitioner model failed to do either of the jobs for which it was designed and recommended several important changes, including: establishing separate practice-oriented programs, potentially in locations other than university psychology departments; developing a practice-oriented training model; and using the Doctor of Psychology (Psy.D) degree to designate preparation for clinical practice. The Committee's conclusions and recommendations met with controversy. In particular, opponents said a different degree would impact the field's prestige and ignore science. Proponents, however, argued it would be informed by science and that other practice-oriented healthcare disciplines, such as medicine, had well-respected professional degrees.

In 1973, the APA sponsored the Conference on Levels and Patterns of Training in Vail, Colorado. Conference members concluded that psychological knowledge had matured sufficiently to warrant creating distinct practice-oriented programs. Members also concluded that if the education and training for practice differs from research, then different degrees should reflect that: when emphasis is on preparing students for providing clinical services, the Doctor of Psychology (Psy.D) degree should be awarded; when the focus is on preparing students for conducting experimental research, the Doctor of Philosophy (PhD) degree should be awarded. This approach became known as the practitioner-scholar model, also known as the Vail model. Graduates of both training models would be eligible for licensure in all jurisdictions in the United States, and the licensing exams and renewal requirements would be the same for both degrees.

With the creation of the Doctor of Psychology degree, the APA confirmed that the Psy.D. is a credential that certifies attainment of the knowledge and skill required to establish clinical psychology as a profession. Furthermore, it follows the policies of both the Association of American Universities, and the Council of Graduate Schools: a professional doctorate (e.g., M.D., DDS, DVM) is awarded in recognition of preparation for professional practice, whereas the PhD. is awarded in recognition of preparation for research.

Education and clinical training
The practice of clinical psychology is based on an understanding of the scientific method and behavioral science. The focus of the Doctor of Psychology training model is on the application of this knowledge for direct clinical intervention. This includes the diagnosis and treatment of mental illness, as well as cognitive and emotional impairments in which psychological approaches may be of use. Compared to PhD., the doctor of psychology is focused toward more clinical work as opposed to the research focus of a doctor of philosophy in psychology.

Doctor of Psychology programs take four to seven years to complete. Students in these programs receive a broad and general education in scientific psychology and evidence-based treatment. Course work includes: Biological bases of behavior; cognitive-affective bases of behavior; social-cultural bases of behavior; lifespan development; assessment and diagnosis; treatment and intervention; research methods and statistics; and ethical and professional standards. Specialized training (e.g., neuropsychology, forensic psychology, psychodynamic psychology) is also available in some programs.

Students in doctoral psychology programs receive extensive clinical training through placements in various settings (e.g., community mental health centers, hospitals, juvenile hall, college counseling centers). These placements provide direct patient contact that is supervised by a licensed psychologist. Clinical training culminates in a 1,750–2,000 hour (1-year full-time or 2-year half-time) supervised internship.

In order to complete the Psy.D. degree, students typically must demonstrate several competencies: 1) knowledge mastery through passing comprehensive exams, and 2) clinical skill through successful completion of a pre-doctoral internship, and 3) scholarship through a doctoral research project.

Regional accreditation is available to doctoral programs in clinical psychology.

The doctoral degree allows for a broader range of career options in schools, private or independent practice, clinics, hospitals, or research/academia. Individuals with doctoral degrees may experience greater eligibility for various credentials.

As stated above, there are three different doctoral degrees for school psychology, PhD., Psy.D., and Ed.D. Career options for those with a PhD. may include being a school psychologist with a license at any level (preschool, primary, secondary or after), a professor for school psychology graduate students and/or screening for possible recruits for a school psychology program or a postdoctoral resident. Overall, those with a PhD. have more opportunities for leadership positions. Those with this degree can work in settings other than schools. Those with a PhD. are more likely to create student development workgroups and review proposals for conventions. They have been known to become editors for Best Practices, work with the editors in chief of journals, members of the NASP Communique Editorial Board, reviewers for the National School Psychology Certification Board and part of NASP's Social Justice Committee. Some school psychologists choose to continue practicing in a K-12 setting but encourage more trained school staff for professional development i.e for functional behavioral assessments and behavior intervention plans. Those who have obtained a PhD. have a greater opportunity to conduct comprehensive neuropsychological evaluations for educational and forensic purposes, review medical/legal records for forensic evaluations, and see clients for therapy. These individuals may even develop new rating scales to the field. Those with this degree have the opportunity to be recognized as a member of the American Psychological Association.

Career options for those who attain an Ed.D. may include becoming a university professor, creating school policy, focusing on administration, educational technology and district-wide leadership, and assisting in adult education, curriculum and instruction. Overall these areas can be broken up into three subgroups; research and academia, management and influence. If the individual chose to be involved in research and academia they could teach at public/private universities and conduct/publish research. The knowledge and experience gained through the doctorate program is imperative in having a successful career in academia. A doctorate is not required for management in some school districts; however, the degree, experience, and education can help in competitive positions. All of the experience and knowledge acquired helps with understanding education from a different perspective.

Psy.D. training has a clinical emphasis compared to PhD., and focusing on delivering psychological services directly to individuals or groups. This allows school psychologists to learn more about mental health. This degree usually takes four to six years to attain. Once the Psy.D. is earned the school psychologist becomes eligible for licensure as a psychologist from an APA approved program. Psy.D. career options may include private practice, working in university based settings (undergraduate teaching or other practitioner scholar Psy.D programs), working in community based mental health centers (behavioral health, disorders, i.e.), working in outpatient settings- clinics for individual or group therapy, or working for juvenile justice programs (work with incarcerated youth). 
It is recommended to work in the field before pursuing a school psychology doctoral degree.

Doctoral training programs may be approved by NASP and/or accredited by the American Psychological Association. In 2007, approximately 125 programs were approved by NASP, and 58 programs were accredited by APA. Another 11 APA-accredited programs were combined (clinical/counseling/school, clinical/school, or counseling/school) programs.

Licensing
A license to practice as a clinical psychologist is required in the United States. While specific requirements vary by jurisdiction, every state mandates: 1. Successful completion of either a 1-year full-time or 2-year half-time supervised clinical internship totaling 1,750–2,000 hours; and 2. Passing the national and state licensing exams. Most states require an additional postdoctoral year of supervised training after earning the doctorate, in order to become eligible to take the national and state licensing exams.

Maryland and Washington have removed the one year postdoctoral experience in place of requiring two years of supervised experience, both of which can be completed prior to graduation. In February 2006, the American Psychological Association Council of Representatives adopted a statement recommending that this change also be made to the licensing requirements of other states since the nature of training has changed dramatically in the last 50 years. Previously, doctoral-level students accrued most of their clinical hours during internship and postdoctoral fellowships. Now, students accrue most of their clinical hours in the course of their training and internship. Thus, they are ready to begin practice upon graduation. Next, there are considerably fewer positions available for recent graduates and providing the training before graduation facilitates early career psychologists.

Licensing Exam [EPPP]

In the United States, a doctoral degree from a program acceptable to the licensing board is required, including the PhD., Psy.D., and Ed.D. are among the doctorate degrees that make individuals eligible to sit for the Examination for Professional Practice of Psychology (EPPP; CA Board of Psychology). The EPPP is the national licensing examination and its completion is required in order for one to obtain a license to practice psychology.

While there is an increasing number of university-based Psy.D. programs, many Psy.D. programs are at newer professional schools of psychology.

See also
 American Psychological Association
 Doctor of Clinical Psychology (U.K. / Australasian equivalent)
 National Register of Health Service Providers in Psychology
 Practitioner–scholar model
 Scientist–practitioner model
 Training and licensing of clinical psychologists

References

Psychology, Doctor of
Psychology education
Degrees offered by unaccredited institutions of higher education

da:Psykolog#Specialpsykolog